Elections to City of Bradford Metropolitan District Council were held on 2 May 2002. One third of the council was up for election, and it remained under no overall control.

Election result

This result had the following consequences for the total number of seats on the council after the elections:

Ward results

References

2002
2002 English local elections
2000s in West Yorkshire